The Mountain Party is a political party in West Virginia, affiliated with the Green Party of the United States.

It is a progressive and environmentalist party whose party platform primarily focuses on "Grassroots Democracy", "Social Justice & Equal Opportunity", "Ecological Wisdom" and "Non-Violence".

History
The Mountain Party was created largely in response to the conservative tilt of the West Virginia Democratic Party, and was thus born out of Denise Giardina's gubernatorial campaign in 2000.

Today, the party is chaired by Denise Binion.

Prominent campaigns
In 2016, the party ran former state senator Charlotte Pritt for Governor of West Virginia. This led to growth for the party. She received nearly 6% of the vote, the highest ever for a Mountain Party gubernatorial candidate.

In 2018, House of Delegates candidate Elliot Pritt was endorsed by the Charleston Gazette.

In 2022, House of Delegates candidate Dylan Parsons was endorsed by two members of the Morgantown City Council, several former Democratic nominees, and the organization WV Can't Wait.

Currently elected officials
The Mountain Party has consistently maintained a number of officeholders for non-partisan offices, despite not being nominated by the party membership. According to the Green Party of the United States elections database, there are two non-partisan officeholders registered with the Mountain Party serving as Conservation District Supervisors.

Election results

State elections

Governor

Legislature

Federal elections

President

Congress

References

Notes

External links

West Virginia
Mountaintop removal mining
Political parties in West Virginia
Political parties established in 2000
2000 establishments in the United States